= Olga Cavalli =

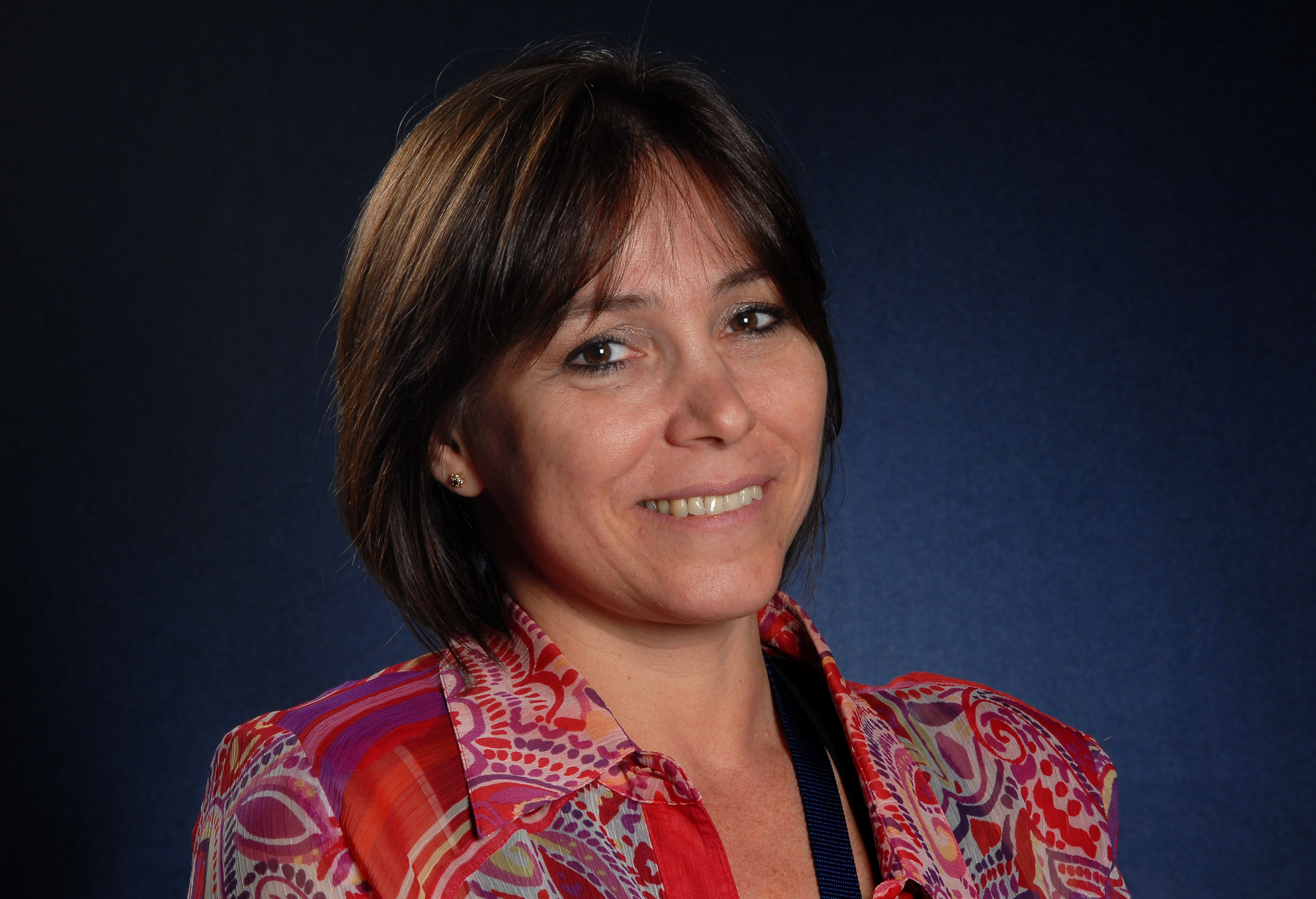
Olga Cavalli, 2009

Interview with Olga Cavalli

Olga Cavalli is an internet leader known for enhancing Internet governance participation in Latin and Central America. She is an active member in ICANN, and is currently a GNSO Council Member appointed by ICANN's Nomcom. Previously she was vicechair of the GAC, and a former MAG member at the United Nations. In 2007, she co-founded the South School on Internet Governance, where intensive Internet governance training was organized every year in a different country of the Americas. The South School on Internet Governance has granted more than 5000 fellowships to students and professionals from all over the world. In 2007 she co-founded ARGENSIG, the Argentina School on Internet Governance, which is focused in training the future Internet Governance leaders of Argentina.

== Personal ==
Olga Cavalli currently resides in Buenos Aires. Cavalli is a mother of two, Juana and Federico.
